The  singles Tournament at the 2007 Barcelona KIA took place between 11 June and 17 June on outdoor clay courts in Barcelona, Catalonia, Spain. Meghann Shaughnessy won the title, defeating Edina Gallovits in the final.

Seeds

Draw

Finals

Top half

Section 1

Section 2

Bottom half

Section 3

Section 4

Qualifying
The four qualifiers were:
 Ágnes Szávay
 Gréta Arn
 Ekaterina Dzehalevich
 María Emilia Salerni

Seeds
The seeded players are listed below. Players in bold have qualified. The players no longer in the tournament are listed with the round in which they exited.

First qualifier

Second qualifier

Third qualifier

Fourth qualifier

References

Main and Qualifying Draws

2007 Singles
Barcelona KIA - Singles